Blackmailers Rekord Orkestr is a Russian rhythm and blues band from Vladimir.

History
The band was created in 1997 by Aleksey Baryshev, a well-known Russian guitar player. At first it was a classical “guitar hero” blues band with an undiluted blues-rock repertoire. However, little by little its creative vision gravitated towards blues formats of Californian persuasion with discernible influences by T-Bone Walker and Tiny Grimes.

At that time, the Blackmailers took part in all major Russian blues festivals and toured the country extensively, but the real breakthrough in the band’s life happened in 2004. Under the impression of the Gypsy Cycle of the famous movie director Emir Kusturica, the Blackmailers attempted to mix the blues with South Slavic folk music. It was then that they discovered for themselves Balkan wedding-and-funeral bands, such as Fanfare Ciocărlia, Kočani Orkestar, and Mahala Rai Banda, which later reshaped the Blackmailers’ music and concert performances.

In 2005 they released their debut album, Zlatno Zrno Blues. The title was an allusion to the flour mill from Kusturica’s Black Cat, White Cat. The record made it to the 2005 Russian Blues Bestsellers Top Ten compiled by the BluesNews network magazine. The band was noticed by the mass media. They played together with the world’s top bluesmen, such as Junior Watson, Gary Primich, Vidar Busk, Rick Holmstrom, Mitch Kashmar, and Alex Schultz.

The band’s second album, Paradise Fanfare Blues, was released in 2007. Its major influences included Nina Simone, T-Bone Walker, Jimmy Witherspoon, and Johnny Cash on the one hand, and Balkan wedding-and-funeral bands on the other hand. The musicians say that their style is evolving slowly and naturally, and that their new album, another attempt at fusing the blues tradition with the Balkan ethnic music, has turned out to be even more organic and powerful.

Discography

Russian musical groups